Adrianne Lee Palicki (born May 6, 1983) is an American actress and model. She is best known for her starring roles as Tyra Collette in the NBC sports drama series Friday Night Lights (2006–2011), as Barbara "Bobbi" Morse/Mockingbird in the ABC superhero drama series Agents of S.H.I.E.L.D. (2014–2016), and as Commander Kelly Grayson in the Fox/Hulu science fiction comedy-drama series The Orville (2017–present).

Palicki also had supporting roles in the films Legion (2010), Red Dawn (2012), G.I. Joe: Retaliation (2013), and John Wick (2014).

Early life
Palicki was born in Toledo, Ohio, the daughter of  Jeffrey Arthur and Nancy Lee (née French) Palicki. She has an older brother, Eric, a comic book writer who influenced her interest in comics.

Career
Palicki was a series regular on the first three seasons of NBC's drama series Friday Night Lights from 2006 to 2009, portraying Tyra Collette. In early 2011, she returned for the final two episodes of the series.

In 2003, Palicki also appeared as Judy Robinson in John Woo's unsold pilot, The Robinsons: Lost in Space. In 2006, she also appeared in The WB pilot Aquaman as the evil Nadia. The pilot was not picked up for series by The CW network, a result of The WB and UPN network merger, which occurred while the pilot was being filmed. She appeared as Kara/Lindsay Harrison in the season 3 finale of Smallville. Palicki appeared in Supernatural as Jessica Moore, Sam Winchester's doomed girlfriend who is killed by a demon in its pilot episode. The character reappears in the Supernatural season 2 episode, "What Is and What Should Never Be", and the season 5 episode "Free To Be You and Me."

She made an appearance in the will.i.am music video "We Are the Ones" in support of 2008 presidential hopeful Barack Obama. In 2010, Palicki joined the FOX television drama Lone Star, which was cancelled after two episodes, despite good reviews. In 2011, Palicki portrayed Wonder Woman in a 2011 pilot produced by David E. Kelley for NBC. The pilot was not picked up as a series. She played the recurring role of Dr. Samantha Lake in season one of the sitcom About a Boy in 2014, reuniting with Friday Night Lights showrunner Jason Katims.

Palicki starred in Legion (2010), and co-starred in G.I. Joe: Retaliation (2013) in the lead female role of Lady Jaye. She also appeared in supporting roles in Red Dawn (2012) and John Wick (2014). Although initially signed on to star in the Jamie Babbit's 2012 horror film Breaking the Girls, due to production delays and scheduling conflicts, she does not appear in the film.

In August 2014, Palicki joined Agents of S.H.I.E.L.D. in a recurring role as Barbara "Bobbi" Morse. She became one of the principal cast after the midseason break of season 2, continuing until her character was written out of the series near the end of season 3. ABC ordered a pilot episode for a spin-off, Marvel's Most Wanted, featuring her character in the lead role, but did not develop it as a series.

In July 2016, Palicki was cast as Kelly Grayson in The Orville, a science fiction comedy-drama series created by Seth MacFarlane, who also stars in it as Captain Mercer, her character's ex-husband. The series premiered on September 10, 2017, and two seasons have aired on FOX. A third season began in June 2022 on Hulu.

In 2016, Palicki and her brother, Eric, collaborated on writing their first comic book, titled No Angel, published by Black Mask Studios. The first issue was released November 30, 2016.

In 2023, Palicki will star in the Hulu Original film Quasi, set to release on April 20, 2023.

Personal life
Palicki has celiac disease. In September 2014, her representative confirmed that she was engaged to stuntman Jackson Spidell, whom she met on the set of John Wick. At the San Diego Comic-Con in 2018, it was revealed that she was dating The Orville co-star Scott Grimes. The two announced their engagement in January 2019 and married on May 19, 2019, in Austin, Texas. She filed for divorce two months later on July 22, 2019. In mid-November of that year, a judge granted Palicki's request to dismiss the filing. Palicki filed for divorce for the second time on July 16, 2020.

Filmography

Film

Television

Music videos

References

External links

 
 
 
 

1983 births
21st-century American actresses
Actresses from Toledo, Ohio
American film actresses
American television actresses
American models
Living people